Events from the year 1968 in Canada.

Incumbents

Crown 
 Monarch – Elizabeth II

Federal government 
 Governor General – Roland Michener
 Prime Minister – Lester B. Pearson (until April 20) then Pierre Trudeau
 Chief Justice – John Robert Cartwright (Ontario)
 Parliament – 27th (until April 23) then 28th (from September 12)

Provincial governments

Lieutenant governors 
Lieutenant Governor of Alberta – Grant MacEwan
Lieutenant Governor of British Columbia – George Pearkes (until July 2) then John Robert Nicholson 
Lieutenant Governor of Manitoba – Richard Spink Bowles 
Lieutenant Governor of New Brunswick – John B. McNair (until January 31) then Wallace Samuel Bird 
Lieutenant Governor of Newfoundland – Fabian O'Dea 
Lieutenant Governor of Nova Scotia – Henry Poole MacKeen (until July 22) then Victor de Bedia Oland
Lieutenant Governor of Ontario – William Earl Rowe (until July 4) then William Ross Macdonald
Lieutenant Governor of Prince Edward Island – Willibald Joseph MacDonald 
Lieutenant Governor of Quebec – Hugues Lapointe 
Lieutenant Governor of Saskatchewan – Robert Hanbidge

Premiers 
Premier of Alberta – Ernest Manning (until December 12) and then Harry Strom
Premier of British Columbia – W.A.C. Bennett 
Premier of Manitoba – Walter Weir
Premier of New Brunswick – Louis Robichaud 
Premier of Newfoundland – Joey Smallwood 
Premier of Nova Scotia – G.I. Smith
Premier of Ontario – John Robarts 
Premier of Prince Edward Island – Alexander B. Campbell 
Premier of Quebec – Daniel Johnson, Sr. (until September 26) and then Jean-Jacques Bertrand (from October 2)
Premier of Saskatchewan – Ross Thatcher

Territorial governments

Commissioners 
 Commissioner of Yukon – James Smith 
 Commissioner of Northwest Territories – Stuart Milton Hodgson

Events

January to June
February 1 – The three branches of the Canadian Forces are merged into one, adopting a common green uniform and Army-derived ranks
February 20 – Prime Minister Pearson gives the first ever televised address to the nation as he tells Canadians that he will table a confidence motion the next day to prove his party still has control. After a week of filibustering by the Opposition, the motion passes.
April 1 – The Canadian Radio-television and Telecommunications Commission (CRTC) is formed
April 6 – Pierre Trudeau wins 1968 Liberal Party leadership election
May 14 – The grand opening of the Toronto-Dominion Centre is held
June 1 – The flag of Alberta is authorized
June 24 – Separatists riot in Montreal on St-Jean-Baptiste Day
June 25 – Federal election: Pierre Trudeau's Liberals win a majority

July to December
July 1 – The laws creating Canada's Medicare system come into effect
July 18–August 9 – Canada Post workers represented by the Canadian Union of Postal Workers go on strike
August 20 – Warsaw Pact troops invade Czechoslovakia to end the "Prague Spring" of political liberalization.  Thousands of refugees flee to Canada.
September 26 – Daniel Johnson, Sr, Premier of Quebec, dies in office
October 2 – Jean-Jacques Bertrand becomes premier of Quebec
October 15 – The Mouvement Souveraineté-Association merges with the Ralliement National to create the Parti Québécois, René Lévesque is selected as the party's first leader
December 12 – Harry Strom becomes premier of Alberta, replacing Ernest Manning
December 31 – Quebec's Legislative Assembly is renamed the National Assembly

Full date unknown
IMAX technique invented
Canada's new Divorce Act introduces no fault divorce
The Rochdale College experiment begins in Toronto

Arts and literature

New works
Alice Munro – Dance of the Happy Shades
Mordecai Richler – Hunting Tigers Under Glass
Robert Fulford – This Was Expo
John Newlove – Black Night Window
Kildare Dobbs – Reading the Time
Mordecai Richler – Cocksure
Robert Kroetsch – Alberta
Marian Engel – No Clouds of Glory
Gordon R. Dickson – Soldier, Ask Not
Farley Mowat – This Rock Within the Sea: A Heritage Lost

Poetry
 Margaret Atwood – The Animals in That Country
 Mary Alice Downie and Barbara Robertson, editors, The Wind Has Wings, anthology of 77 Canadian poems for children (anthology)
 Dennis Lee, editor, T. O. Now, anthology of 13 "apprentice poets living in Toronto" (anthology)
 Joe Rosenblatt, Winter of the Luna Moon
 Irving Layton, The Shattered Plinths, 60 new poems
 Leonard Cohen, Selected Poems, 1956-1968
 Al Purdy, Wild Grape Wine
 Dorothy Livesay, The Documentaries, poems from the 1930s and 1940s, and including "Roots", a long poem

Awards
David Suzuki wins UNESCO's Kalinga Prize for science writing
See 1968 Governor General's Awards for a complete list of winners and finalists for those awards.
Stephen Leacock Award: Max Ferguson, And Now...Here's Max
Vicky Metcalf Award: Lorraine McLaughlin

Theatre
August 28 – Michel Tremblay's Les Belles-Sœurs premiers in Montreal.

Art
December 18 – Henry Moore donates hundreds of works to the Art Gallery of Ontario.

Sport
March 10 - Alberta Golden Bears won their Second Memorial Cup be defeating the Loyola Warriors 5 to 4. The Final game was played at the Montreal Forum
May 11 - Montreal Canadiens won their Fifteenth Stanley Cup by defeating the St. Louis Blues 4 games to 0. The deciding Game 4 was played at the Montreal Forum. Jean Beliveau wins his Second Conn Smythe Trophy
May 27 – Montreal Expos are established as Major League Baseball's First Canadian team.
November 22 - Queen's Golden Gaels won their First Vanier Cup by defeating the Waterloo Lutheran Golden Hawks by a score of 42–14 in the 4th Vanier Cup played at Varsity Stadium in Toronto
November 29 - Ottawa Rough Riders won their Sixth Grey Cup defeated the Calgary Stampeders 24 to 21 in the 56th Grey Cup played at Exhibition Stadium in Toronto

Births

January to March
January 1 – Darren Greer, writer
January 5 – Joé Juneau, ice hockey player
January 7 – Tara Croxford, field hockey player
January 13 – Pat Onstad, international soccer player
January 14 – Michael Meldrum, swimmer
January 19 - Matt Hill, voice actor
January 28  – Sarah McLachlan, musician, singer and songwriter
February 1 – Mark Recchi, ice hockey player
February 9 – Joel Brough, field hockey player
February 22 – Shawn Graham, politician and 31st Premier of New Brunswick
February 27 – Matt Stairs, baseball player
March 14 – Megan Follows, Canadian-American actress
March 17 – Patty Sullivan, television personality
March 30 – Celine Dion, singer, songwriter and actress

April to June
April 12 – Adam Graves, ice hockey player
April 18 – David Hewlett, UK-born actor  
April 20 – Evan Solomon, writer, magazine publisher and television host
May 8 – Louise Stratten, actress and younger sister of the murdered actress Dorothy Stratten
May 12 – Jane Kerr, swimmer
May 14 – Mary DePiero, diver
May 20 – William Irwin, boxer
May 30 – Jason Kenney, politician and Minister
June 1 – Jeff Hackett, ice hockey player and coach
June 7 – Macha Grenon, actress
June 10 – Susan Haskell, actress
June 16 – Lyne Poirier, judoka
June 27 – Pascale Bussières, actress
June 29 – Theoren Fleury, ice hockey player

July to September
July 2 – Mark Tewksbury, swimmer and Olympic gold medalist
July 11 – Michael Cram, actor and singer-songwriter
July 12 – Paul Hopkins, actor
July 22 – Harry Taylor, swimmer
August 5 – Terri Clark, country music singer
August 10 – Greg Hawgood, ice hockey player
August 20 – Jody Holden, beach volleyball player
September 9 – Lisa Lougheed, singer and actress
September 19 – Shawn Doyle, actor
September 20 – Leah Pinsent, actress
September 22 – Lisa Alexander, synchronised swimmer
September 23 – Donna McGinnis, swimmer

October to December
October 2 – Sandy Goss, swimmer
October 2 – Glen Wesley, ice hockey player
October 26 – Tom Cavanagh, actor
November 1 – Andrea Nugent, swimmer
November 3 – Debbie Rochon, actress
November 5 – Terry McGurrin, actor, comedian and writer
November 14 – Serge Postigo, actor
November 19 – Gord Fraser, road racing cyclist
November 25 – Jill Hennessy, actress and musician, and Jacqueline Hennessy, actress and journalist
December 2 – Darren Ward, swimmer
December 3 – Brendan Fraser, actor
December 10 – Caroline Wittrin, hammer thrower
December 17 – Paul Tracy, racing car driver

Deaths

January 31 – George Arthur Brethen, politician (b.1877)
February 5 – Frances Loring, sculptor (b.1887)
February 13 – Portia White, singer (b.1911)
February 16 – Healey Willan, organist and composer (b.1880)
February 17 – Ernest Charles Drury, politician, writer and 8th Premier of Ontario (b.1878)
March 10 - William John Rose, historian
March 22 - Margaret Duley, Newfoundland author
April 29 – Aubin-Edmond Arsenault, politician and Premier of Prince Edward Island (b.1870)
May 30 – Charles Gavan Power, politician, Minister and Senator (b.1888)
June 14 – John B. McNair, lawyer, politician, judge and 22nd Lieutenant Governor of New Brunswick (b.1889)
August 1 – Maurice Spector, Chairman of the Communist Party of Canada (b.1898)
August 14 - Olivier Maurault, French-Canadian historian
August 21 – Germaine Guèvremont, French-Canadian writer (b.1893)
September 26 – Daniel Johnson, Sr., politician and 20th Premier of Quebec (b.1915)
December 15 – Antonio Barrette, politician and 18th Premier of Quebec (b.1899)

See also 
 1968 in Canadian television
 List of Canadian films

References 

 
Years of the 20th century in Canada
Canada
1968 in North America